Arnulf Krause (born 27 November 1955) is a German philologist who specializes in Germanic studies.

Biography
Arnulf Krause was born in Zell im Wiesental, Germany. He received his Ph.D. at the University of Bonn in 1989. He is a professor of Old Norse language and literature at the University of Bonn, where he also lectures in Germanic studies. Krause specializes in early Germanic literature and religion. He is the author of numerous books about Germanic peoples, Celts and Vikings.

See also
 Rudolf Simek
 Wilhelm Heizmann
 Robert Nedoma

Selected works

Monographs
 Die Dichtung des Eyvindr Skáldaspillir. Literaturverlag Norden Rheinhardt, Leverkusen 1990,  (= Dissertation).
 Die Geschichte der Germanen. Campus, Frankfurt/Main 2002, .
 Die Welt der Kelten. Geschichte und Mythos eines rätselhaften Volkes. Campus, Frankfurt/Main 2004, .
 Die Welt der Wikinger. Campus, Frankfurt/Main 2006, .
 Europa im Mittelalter. Wie die Zeit der Kreuzzüge unsere moderne Gesellschaft prägt. Campus, Frankfurt/Main 2008, .
 Von Göttern und Helden. Die mythische Welt der Kelten, Germanen und Wikinger. Theiss, Stuttgart 2010, .
 Lexikon der germanischen Mythologie und Heldensage. Reclam, Stuttgart 2010, .
 Die wirkliche Mittelerde. Tolkiens Mythologie und ihre Wurzeln im Mittelalter. Theiss, Stuttgart 2012, .
 Der Kampf um Freiheit. Die Napoleonischen Freiheitskriege in Deutschland. Konrad Theiss Verlag, Darmstadt 2013, .
 Runen. Geschichte – Gebrauch – Bedeutung. Marix Verlag, Wiesbaden 2017,

Translations
 Die Edda des Snorri Sturluson. Ausgewählt, übersetzt und kommentiert von Arnulf Krause. Reclam, Stuttgart 1997, .
 Die Heldenlieder der Älteren Edda. Übersetzt, kommentiert und herausgegeben von Arnulf Krause. Reclam, Stuttgart 2001, .
 Die Götter- und Heldenlieder der älteren Edda. Übersetzt, kommentiert und herausgegeben von Arnulf Krause. Reclam, Stuttgart 2004, .
 Die Götterlieder der Älteren Edda. Übersetzt, kommentiert und herausgegeben von Arnulf Krause. Reclam, Stuttgart 2006, .
 Die Weisheit der Wikinger. Insel-Verlag, Berlin 2011, .

Sources
 Kürschners Deutscher Gelehrten-Kalender 2012. (24. Ausgabe). De Gruyter, Berlin 2011, . (Geistes- und Sozialwissenschaften)

External links
 Arnulf Krause at the website of the University of Bonn

1955 births
German male non-fiction writers
German philologists
Germanic studies scholars
Living people
Old Norse studies scholars
People from Lörrach (district)
University of Bonn alumni
Academic staff of the University of Bonn
Writers on Germanic paganism
Translators of the Poetic Edda